James Akaminko (born 16 September 1995) is a Ghanaian football midfielder who plays for Accra Great Olympics

See also
Jerry Akaminko
Football in Ghana

References

1995 births
Living people
Ghanaian footballers
Ghana international footballers
Tema Youth players
Ashanti Gold SC players
Association football midfielders